James Edward Kearney (October 28, 1884 – January 12, 1977) was an American prelate of the Roman Catholic Church. He served as bishop of the Diocese of Salt Lake City in Utah (1932–1937) and bishop of the Diocese of Rochester in New York (1937–1966).

Biography

Early life 
James Kearney was born in Red Oak, Iowa, the second of the three sons of William Patrick and Rosina (née O'Doherty) Kearney. His parents were immigrants from County Donegal in Ireland. In 1886, the family moved to New York City, where his father worked selling furniture. Kearney received his early education at Public School No. 27 since there was no parochial school at his home parish, St. Agnes.

Kearney graduated from DeWitt Clinton High School in the Bronx in 1901.  He then attended the Teachers College of Columbia University in Manhattan, earning a Regents license to teach in New York State. In 1903, Kearney began studying for the priesthood at St. Joseph's Seminary in Yonkers, New York. He was sent in 1908 to complete his theological studies at the Catholic University of America in Washington, D.C.

Priesthood 
Kearney was ordained to the priesthood for the Archdiocese of New York by Bishop Thomas Cusack on September 19, 1908. He earned a Licentiate of Sacred Theology from Catholic University in 1909. Following his return to New York City, he was assigned as a curate at St. Cecilia's Parish  in Manhattan, remaining there until 1928. In addition to his pastoral duties, Kearney taught at Cathedral College in Queens, New York.

Kearney served as the first pastor of St. Francis Xavier's Parish in the Bronx from 1928 to 1932 and founded the parish school there in 1929. During his tenure at St. Francis Xavier, he also served as professor of religion at Good Counsel College in White Plains, New York, and as superintendent of parochial schools in the Bronx.

Bishop of Salt Lake City 
On July 1, 1932, Kearney was appointed the fourth bishop of the Diocese of Salt Lake City by Pope Pius XI. He received his episcopal consecration on October 28, 1932, from Cardinal Patrick Hayes, with Bishops John Mitty and John Dunn serving as co-consecrators, at St. Patrick's Cathedral in Manhattan His installation took place at the Cathedral of the Madeleine in Salt Lake City on November 24, 1932.

Bishop of Rochester 
Following the appointment of Bishop Edward Mooney to the Archdiocese of Detroit, Kearney was appointed the fifth bishop of the Diocese of Rochester on October 21, 1937. He was installed on November 11, 1937. During his 29-year tenure, the  number of Catholics in the diocese rose from 223,657 to 361,790; the parishes from 129 to 155; the priests from 289 to 371; and the parochial schools from 72 to 99. He attended all four sessions of the Second Vatican Council in Rome between 1962 and 1965. He also served as state chaplain for the Knights of Columbus and moderator of the Newman Club Federation. Kearney also did much of the original planning that led to the foundation of McQuaid Jesuit High School in Brighton, New York.

Retirement and legacy 
On October 21, 1966, Pope Paul VI accepted Kearney's resignation as bishop of Rochester and appointed him as titular bishop of Tabaicara. He resigned his titular see on January 18, 1971. James Kearney died on January 12, 1977, at St. Ann's Home in Rochester, at age 92.The following buildings or schools are named after Bishop Kearney:

 Bishop Kearney High School in Irondequoit, New York
 Kearney Residence Hall at Nazareth College in Pittsford, New York
 Kearney Hall at Saint John Fisher College in Pittsford is named for his mother.

Viewpoints

Politics 
In 1936, Kearney spoke before the Knights of Columbus, urging them to fight communism and saying, "The spirit of Christ has been driven out of one organization after another...When statesmen meet no thought of God or representative of God is in their council." During World War II, Kearney declared, "The spirit of Christianity can dictate a lasting peace, but secularism, exploitation or totalitarianism cannot, whether of Nazi, Communist or Fascist variety."

Popular culture 
Kearney condemned what he termed the "mad craze for entertainment" in modern society, including picture magazines, saying man had brought evil upon himself because he did not "pause to take stock of his relationship with God." In 1947, he denounced the 1947 film Forever Amber as a "glorification of immorality and licentiousness," and encouraged Catholics to boycott it.

Education 
Kearney accused colleges of teaching their students "cynical precepts" and causing them to distrust the "perfect lessons they learned at their mother's knee." He also said, "Those who declare it doesn't make any difference what we believe in an attempt to attain religious harmony will fail. For religious intolerance was created...by people who sold dogmatic teaching short."

Notes

|-
 

1884 births
1977 deaths
Roman Catholic bishops of Salt Lake City
20th-century Roman Catholic bishops in the United States
American people of Irish descent
Teachers College, Columbia University alumni
Participants in the Second Vatican Council
People from Red Oak, Iowa
Roman Catholic Diocese of Rochester
Saint Joseph's Seminary (Dunwoodie) alumni
Catholic University of America alumni
People of the Roman Catholic Archdiocese of New York
Religious leaders from New York (state)
DeWitt Clinton High School alumni
Catholics from New York (state)
Catholics from Iowa